Rodrigo González Barrios (born 12 March 1958) is a Mexican politician affiliated with the PRD. As of 2013 he served as Deputy of the LXII Legislature of the Mexican Congress representing Nayarit.

References

1958 births
Living people
Politicians from Nayarit
Party of the Democratic Revolution politicians
21st-century Mexican politicians
Autonomous University of Nayarit alumni
Members of the Congress of Nayarit
20th-century Mexican politicians
Deputies of the LXII Legislature of Mexico
Members of the Chamber of Deputies (Mexico) for Nayarit